SALT is a Turkish contemporary art institution. It was started by Vasif Kortun and Garanti Bank in 2011, and has exhibition and workshop spaces in Istanbul and Ankara, Turkey. It combines the previous activities of the Garanti Gallery, the Ottoman Bank Archives and Research Centre and the Platform Garanti Contemporary Art Center of the bank. It is one of the six members of L'Internationale, a confederation of European art institutions; the other member institutions are the Moderna galerija in Ljubljana, in Slovenia; the Museo Nacional Centro de Arte Reina Sofía in Madrid, in Spain; the Museu d'Art Contemporani de Barcelona in Barcelona, also in Spain; the Museum van Hedendaagse Kunst Antwerpen in Antwerp, in Belgium; and the Van Abbemuseum in Eindhoven, in the Netherlands.

Exhibition spaces 

SALT has three exhibition spaces, all owned by Garanti Bank: the former headquarters of the Imperial Ottoman Bank in Galata, Istanbul; a former apartment block, the Siniossoglou Apartments, in Beyoğlu, Istanbul; and a former guest-house of the Ottoman Bank in Ulus, Ankara.

Exhibitions and Projects 
In 2012, the artist and curator Didem Özbek staged her project He was working on a project in order to open a watermelon exhibition at Salt Galata, drawing on Sait Faik Abasıyanık’s story Bir Karpuz Sergisi [A Watermelon Exhibition].

Links 
Website of Salt

References 

Art museums and galleries in Istanbul
Museums in Istanbul
Libraries in Turkey
Buildings and structures in Istanbul
Art museums established in 2011
2011 establishments in Turkey